Birds, Beasts and Flowers is a collection of poetry by the English author D. H. Lawrence, first published in 1923. These poems include some of Lawrence's finest reflections on the 'otherness' of the non-human world.

Lawrence started the poems in this collection during a stay in San Gervasio near Florence in September 1920. He continued working on individual poems in Taormina (Sicily), Ceylon and Australia before completing the book in February 1923 whilst staying in New Mexico.

Many of these individual poems are popular in anthologies. However, they also need to be seen within the context of the whole book. In preparing the original collection for publication, the author grouped the poems into the sequence shown in the table of contents and then prefaced many of the sub-sections with brief quotations from the third edition of John Burnet's Early Greek Philosophy, a book that he was particularly interested in at the time.

Table of contents 

FRUITS:
Pomegranate
Peach
Medlars and Sorb-Apples
Fig
Grapes
The Revolutionary
The Evening Land
Peace
TREES:
Cypresses
Bare Fig-Trees
Bare Almond-Trees
Tropic
Southern Night
FLOWERS:
Almond Blossom
Purple Anemones
Sicilian Cyclamens
Hibiscus and Salvia Flowers
THE EVANGELISTIC BEASTS:
St Matthew
St Mark
St Luke
St John
CREATURES:
Mosquito
Fish
Bat
Man and Bat
REPTILES:
Snake
Baby Tortoise
Tortoise Shell
Tortoise Family Connections
Lui et Elle
Tortoise Gallantry
Tortoise Shout
BIRDS:
Turkey-Cock 
Humming-Bird
Eagle in New Mexico
Blue Jay
ANIMALS:
Ass 
He-Goat
She-Goat
Elephant
Kangaroo
Bibbles
Mountain Lion
The Red Wolf
GHOSTS:
Men in New Mexico 
Autumn at Taos 
Spirits summoned West
The American Eagle

Standard edition 
Birds, Beasts and Flowers, Black Sparrow Press, Santa Rosa, 2001

Further reading 
F B Pinion (1978) A D. H. Lawrence Companion, Macmillan, London,

External links
  

1923 poetry books
English poetry collections
Poetry by D. H. Lawrence
Martin Secker books